Marcus Anthony Mailei (born October 30, 1986) is a former American football fullback. After playing college football for Weber State, he was signed by the Philadelphia Eagles as an undrafted free agent in 2009. He was a member of the New Orleans Saints from 2009–2010.

Early years
Mailei attended Highland High School in Salt Lake City, Utah and was a letterman in football and rugby, playing for the famous Highland Rugby Team coached by Larry Gelwix. He was rated a two-star prospect by Rivals.com. He also appeared as an extra in the film Forever Strong about Gelwix's life.

Mailei is an Eagle Scout.

College career
Mailei saw playing time in his freshman year in 2005, but was limited by a knee injury. In 2006, Mailei started all 11 games for the Wildcats and was Weber State's third-leading receiver with 241 yards and three touchdowns and also rushed for 72 yards and two scores, and earned Honorable Mention All-Big Sky honors. As a junior in 2007, Mailei saw a decrease in numbers, but established himself as the lead blocker for 4-time First-team All-Big Sky rusher Trevyn Smith, netting himself a First-team All-Big Sky selection. In 2008, Mailei entered the year with NFL potential, which brought him attention from NFL scouts. He took part in arguably Weber State's most successful season in program history, in which the Wildcats won their first Big Sky Championship in 40 years and advanced to the second round of the FCS playoffs. Mailei garnered another First-team All Big Sky Selection in 2008, in addition to a TSN Honorable Mention selection to the All-America Team.

Following his senior season, Mailei was invited to participate in the Texas vs The Nation all-star game in El Paso, Texas.

Professional career

Pre-draft
Prior to the 2009 NFL Draft, Mailei was invited to the NFL Scouting Combine in Indianapolis, where he suffered from flu-like symptoms.

Philadelphia Eagles
Mailei was signed as an undrafted free agent by the Philadelphia Eagles on April 27, 2009. He was waived during final roster cuts on September 5, 2009, and re-signed to the team's practice squad on September 7, 2009.

New Orleans Saints
Mailei was signed off the Eagles' practice squad by the New Orleans Saints on December 9, 2009, after the team waived fullback Kyle Eckel, and played in two games. Eckel was re-signed on December 21 when Mailei was placed on season-ending injured reserve with a hamstring injury.

Mailei returned to the Saints in 2010 but suffered a leg injury during training camp; he was waived/injured on August 20, 2010, and subsequently reverted to the team's injured reserve list after clearing waivers the next day. He was waived on February 10, 2011.

References

External links
 
 Philadelphia Eagles bio
 Weber State Wildcats football bio

1986 births
Living people
Players of American football from Salt Lake City
American football fullbacks
Weber State Wildcats football players
Philadelphia Eagles players
New Orleans Saints players
American people of Tongan descent